is a passenger railway station located in the city of Yamato, Kanagawa, Japan and operated by the private railway operator Odakyu Electric Railway.

Lines
It lies 37.4 kilometers from the Shinjuku terminus.

Station layout
The station consists of two side platforms serving two tracks, which are connected to the station building, which is built above the platforms and tracks.

Platforms

History
Tsuruma Station was opened on April 1, 1929. The new station building was opened on October 18, 1980.

Passenger statistics
In fiscal 2019, the station was used by an average of 30,356 passengers daily.

The passenger figures for previous years are as shown below.

Surrounding area
Yamato City Hall
Yamato Municipal Hospital
Yamato City Labor Welfare Hall
Yamato City Health and Welfare Center
Izumi no Mori, a nature park operated by the city of Yamato

See also
 List of railway stations in Japan

References

External links

  

Railway stations in Kanagawa Prefecture
Railway stations in Japan opened in 1929
Odakyū Enoshima Line
Railway stations in Yamato, Kanagawa